Allens Spring is an unincorporated community in Pope County, in the U.S. state of Illinois.

History
A post office was established at Allen Spring in 1857, and remained in operation until 1928. George M. Allen, an early postmaster, gave the community his name.

References

Unincorporated communities in Pope County, Illinois
1857 establishments in Illinois
Populated places established in 1857
Unincorporated communities in Illinois